Joseph-Auguste Frigon (7 February 1870 – 14 February 1944) was a local entrepreneur and politician in the Mauricie area.  He served as the fourth Mayor of Shawinigan, Quebec and as Member of the Legislative Assembly.

Early life

He was born in 1870 in Saint-Prosper, Mauricie, Quebec.

Municipal Politics

Frigon was Mayor of Saint-Narcisse, Quebec from 1896 to 1899.

He moved to Shawinigan in the early 1900s for business reasons and ran for Mayor of that city against Beaudry Leman in 1902 but lost the election by a single ballot.

Frigon ran again in 1913 and won.  He was defeated by Edmond Thibaudeau in 1915, but was re-elected in 1917.

Provincial Politics

In 1927, Frigon became the Liberal Member of the Legislative Assembly for the district of Saint-Maurice.  He was re-elected in 1931, but was defeated by Marc Trudel in 1935.

Federal Politics

Frigon also unsuccessfully ran as an Independent Liberal candidate in the federal district of Saint-Maurice—Laflèche in 1940.  Incumbent Joseph-Alphida Crête was re-elected.

After Retirement

Frigon died in Shawinigan in 1944.

Legacy

Rue Frigon (Frigon Street) in Shawinigan was named to honour him.

Footnotes

See also
Mayors of Shawinigan
Mauricie
Saint-Maurice Legislators
Saint-Maurice Provincial Electoral District
Shawinigan, Quebec

External links
 

1870 births
1944 deaths
Independent candidates in the 1940 Canadian federal election
Mayors of Shawinigan
Quebec Liberal Party MNAs